Anomalempis is a genus of flies in the family Empididae.

Species
A. archon Melander, 1945
A. tacomae Melander, 1928

References

Empidoidea genera
Empididae